Souihla (also written Souehla) is a village in the commune of Sidi Aoun, in Magrane District, El Oued Province, Algeria.

References

Neighbouring towns and cities

Populated places in El Oued Province